This is a list of the flags of the subdivisions of Poland, including the voivodeships (first-level subdivisions), counties (second-level subdivisions), and gminas (third-level subdivions).

Voivodeships

Current

Historical

Vertical flags

Cities with powiat rights

Powiats

Flags of gminas

See also 
 List of Polish flags
 Coats of arms of Polish voivodeships
 Flag of Silesia and Lower Silesia

Flags
Voivodeships of Poland
subdivisions
 
 
subdivisions
Poland